Shadlog Armait Bernicke (born 8 July 1966) is a Nauruan politician.

Political role

Bernicke was elected to parliament in the 2007 general elections. He gained the former seat of Terangi Adam.

He has been re-elected in the 2008 polls.

Parliamentary constituency

He represents the Buada Constituency in the Parliament of Nauru.

He became acting Speaker of the Parliament of Nauru on 27 April 2010 not long before elections were held.

Waqa Cabinet
Bernicke is currently serving as a minister in the Cabinet of Nauru. His positions are Minister for the Nauru Phosphate Royalties Trust, Minister for the Nauru Utilities Corporation, and Minister of Telecommunications.

Family background

Bernicke is a grandson of former parliamentarian Austin Bernicke, a member of the first Parliament in 1968.

See also

 Politics of Nauru
 Elections in Nauru
 2008 Nauruan parliamentary election

References

Members of the Parliament of Nauru
Speakers of the Parliament of Nauru
People from Buada District
1966 births
Living people
Government ministers of Nauru
21st-century Nauruan politicians